Nordheim can refer to:

Places 
France
 Nordheim, Bas-Rhin, municipality in Alsace
Germany
 Northeim, a city in Lower Saxony, formerly spelled Nordheim
 Nordheim vor der Rhön, a municipality in Bavaria
 Nordheim am Main, a municipality in Bavaria
 Nordheim, Baden-Württemberg, a municipality
 Nordheim, Thuringia, municipality
Norway 
 Nordheim, Hordaland, also spelled Norheim, a village in Hordaland county
 Norheim, Rogaland, also spelled Nordheim, a village in Rogaland county
United States
 Nordheim, Texas
 Northeim, Wisconsin, an unincorporated community

People 
 Arne Nordheim, composer
 Kari Nordheim-Larsen
 Lothar Wolfgang Nordheim
 Otto of Nordheim

See also 
 Nord (disambiguation)
 Norde (disambiguation)
 Norden (disambiguation)
 Norheim (cf.Sondre Norheim)